There have been two baronetcies created for persons with the surname Moon, both in the Baronetage of the United Kingdom.

The Moon Baronetcy, of Portman Square, in the County of Middlesex, was created in the Baronetage of the United Kingdom on 4 May 1855 for the printseller and publisher Francis Moon. He was Lord Mayor of London from 1854 to 1855.

The Moon Baronetcy, of Copsewood Grange, in the parish Stoke, in the County of Warwick, was created in the Baronetage of the United Kingdom on 22 July 1887 for Richard Moon, Chairman of the London and North Western Railway from 1861 to 1891.

Moon baronets, of Portman Square (1855)
Sir Francis Graham Moon, 1st Baronet (1796–1871)
Sir Edward Graham Moon, 2nd Baronet (1825–1904)
Sir Francis Sidney Graham-Moon, 3rd Baronet (1855–1911)
Sir (Arthur) Wilfred Graham-Moon, 4th Baronet (1905–1954)
Sir Peter Wilfred Giles Graham-Moon, 5th Baronet (1942–2023)
Sir Rupert Francis Wilfred Graham-Moon, 6th Baronet (born 1968)

Moon baronets, of Copsewood Grange (1887)
Sir Richard Moon, 1st Baronet (1814–1899)
Sir Cecil Ernest Moon, 2nd Baronet (1867–1951)
Sir Richard Moon, 3rd Baronet (1901–1961)
Sir John Arthur Moon, 4th Baronet (1905–1979)
Sir Edward Moon, 5th Baronet (1911–1988)
Sir Roger Moon, 6th Baronet (1914–2017)
Humphrey Moon, presumed 7th Baronet (born 1919)

Notes

References
Kidd, Charles, Williamson, David (editors). Debrett's Peerage and Baronetage (1990 edition). New York: St Martin's Press, 1990.

External links
Painting of Sir Richard Moon, 1st Baronet
Copsewood Grange history

Moon
1855 establishments in the United Kingdom